Julie Steggall (born 26 October 1971) is a Canadian freestyle skier. She was born in Ottawa, Ontario. She competed at the 1994 Winter Olympics, in women's moguls.

References

External links 

1971 births
Skiers from Ottawa
Living people
Canadian female freestyle skiers
Olympic freestyle skiers of Canada
Freestyle skiers at the 1994 Winter Olympics